The following is a list of notable deaths in May 2013.

Entries for each day are listed alphabetically by surname. A typical entry lists information in the following sequence:
Name, age, country of citizenship and reason for notability, established cause of death, reference.

May 2013

1
Martin Kevan, 66, Kenyan-born Canadian film and voice actor (Far Cry 3) and author, cancer.
Massimo Mollica, 84, Italian actor and stage director.
Pierre Pleimelding, 60, French football player (national team) and manager (SAS Épinal, Ivory Coast, FCSR Haguenau).
Henry Hope Reed Jr., 97, American architecture critic.
Gregory Rogers, 55, Australian children's book writer, cancer.
Ruby Stone, 89, American politician, member of the Idaho House of Representatives (1986–2002).
Stuart Wilde, 66, British writer and metaphysical teacher, heart attack.
Chob Yodkaew, 78, Thai economist and politician, stroke.

2
Sir Terence Beckett, 89, British businessman, Director-General of the Confederation of British Industry.
Marcel B%C3%A9langer, 92, Canadian academic.
Roddy Blackjack, 86, Canadian Little Salmon/Carmacks First Nation elder and chief, architect of Yukon Land Claims agreement.
Elbert Crawford, 46, American football offensive lineman, heart attack.
Mihail Dolgan, 85, Moldovan professor.
Boris Elik, 83, Canadian ice hockey player (Detroit Red Wings).
Ernie Field, 70, English boxer, cancer.
Jeff Hanneman, 49, American guitarist (Slayer), liver failure.
Ken Lippiatt, 93, Australian rules footballer.
Joseph P. McFadden, 65, American Roman Catholic prelate, Bishop of Harrisburg (since 2010), heart attack.
Allen McKay, 86, British politician, MP for Penistone (1978–1983) and Barnsley West and Penistone (1983–1992).
Tancred Melis, 79, South African cricketer.
Danny Ray Mitchell, 69, American pastor, businessman and politician.
Dvora Omer, 80, Israeli author, recipient of the Israel Prize (2006).
Jo Pitt, 34, Scottish paralympic equestrian, pulmonary veno-occlusive disease.
Bob Rafkin, 69, American singer songwriter, cancer.
James E. Ramsey, 81, American politician, member of North Carolina House of Representatives (1963–1974), Speaker (1973–1974), complications from a stroke.
Harry Randall Jr., 86, American politician.
Sylvester Sanfilippo, 87, American pediatrician.
Gordon Sherwood, 83, American classical composer.
Sarabjit Singh, 49, Indian convicted spy, injuries sustained from blunt force trauma.
Ronald Thresher, 82, English cricketer.
Ivan Turina, 32, Croatian footballer (AIK Stockholm), cardiac dysrhythmia.
Selma Urfer, 85, Swiss author and actress.
Lefteris Vogiatzes, 68, Greek theater actor and director, cancer.
Charles Banks Wilson, 94, American artist.

3

Joe Astroth, 90, American baseball player (Philadelphia/Kansas City Athletics).
Herbert Blau, 87, American theater director, scholar and theorist, sarcomatoid carcinoma of the chest.
Cedric Brooks, 70, Jamaican musician (The Skatalites), cardiac arrest.
Keith Carter, 88, American Olympic silver medalist swimmer (1948).
Bruno Chersicla, 75, Italian painter and sculptor.
Walt Clay, 89, American football player.
Brad Drewett, 54, Australian tennis player and administrator, ATP Executive Chairman (2012–2013), motor neurone disease.
David Morris Kern, 103, American pharmacist, developed Orajel to fight toothaches.
Curtis Rouse, 52, American football player (Minnesota Vikings, San Diego Chargers).
Branko Vukelić, 55, Croatian politician, Minister of Defence (2008–2010), pancreatic cancer.
Sir David Innes Williams, 93, British paediatric urologist.

4
Bobbie Banda, 66, American Juaneño elder and activist, stroke.
Otis Bowen, 95, American politician, Governor of Indiana (1973–1981), Secretary of Health and Human Services (1985–1989).
Christian de Duve, 95, Belgian cytologist and biochemist, Nobel Prize laureate (1974), euthanasia.
Javier Díez Canseco, 65, Peruvian politician and sociologist, MP (1995–2000, 2001–2006, since 2011), pancreatic cancer.
Frederic Franklin, 98, British-born American ballet dancer and director, complications from pneumonia.
Sylvi Keskinen, 79, Finnish Olympic hurdler.
Ed Kringstad, 76, American politician, member of the North Dakota Senate (1995–2006).
Len Legault, 80, Canadian Football League player.
Alton Lemon, 84, American civil rights activist, Alzheimer's disease.
Fredric Lieberman, American ethnomusicologist, composer, music professor, and author, cardiac arrest.
Mario Machado, 78, American news anchor, journalist and actor (Scarface, RoboCop, St. Elmo's Fire), Parkinson's disease.
Jack Makari, 95, Lebanese-American cancer immunologist.
Sir Morgan Morgan-Giles, 98, British Royal Navy officer and politician, MP for Winchester (1964–1979).
David Noriega Rodríguez, 68, Puerto Rican politician and lawyer, member of the House of Representatives (1984–1996), pancreatic cancer.
César Portillo de la Luz, 90, Cuban Filin composer and interpreter.
Jacques Stockman, 74, Belgian footballer (R.S.C. Anderlecht).
John Swaim, 64, American attorney, Pennsylvania state legislator.
Wilbur Zelinsky, 91, American cultural geographer.

5
Jürg Amann, 65, Swiss author and dramatist.
Alan Arnell, 79, English footballer (Liverpool).
Sir Richard Barratt, 84, British police officer, Chief Inspector of Constabulary (1987–1990).
Peter Curtis, 83, Australian public servant and diplomat.
Lotfi Dziri, 67, Tunisian actor.
Rossella Falk, 86, Italian actress (8½, Modesty Blaise, The Legend of Lylah Clare).
William Havens, 94, American Olympic canoer (1948).
Grady Hunt, 91, American costume designer.
Dean Jeffries, 80, American car customizer, painter and stuntman (The Fugitive, Fletch).
Mazin Abu Kalal, Iraqi politician, bombing.
Sarah Kirsch, 78, German poet.
G. X. McSherry, 88, American politician, member of the New Mexico House of Representatives (1982–1998).
Tore Magnussen, 74, Norwegian boxer.
Eugene Millerick, 88, American politician, member of the Connecticut House of Representatives (1986–1994).
Bill Orr, 78, American insurance executive, First Gentleman of Nebraska (1987–1991), COPD.
Leif Preus, 85, Norwegian photographer, founder of the Preus Museum.
Greg Quill, 66, Australian roots musician and entertainment critic (Toronto Star), pneumonia.
Robert Ressler, 76, American criminologist.
Hayri Sezgin, 52, Turkish Olympic wrestler.
Peu Sousa, 35, Brazilian guitarist (Nove Mil Anjos, Pitty) and record producer, suicide by hanging.
Dirk Vekeman, 52, Belgian footballer (RSC Anderlecht).
Helmin Wiels, 54, Curaçaoan politician, leader of Pueblo Soberano in the Estates of Curaçao (since 2010), shot.
Menachem Yedid, 95, Israeli politician, member of the Knesset (1965–1977).

6
Diana Keppel, Dowager Countess of Albemarle, 103, British aristocrat.
Giulio Andreotti, 94, Italian politician, Prime Minister (1972–1973, 1976–1979, 1989–1992), Minister of Foreign Affairs (1983–1989) and Lifetime Senator (since 1991).
Yordan Angelov, 59, Bulgarian Olympic silver medallist volleyball player (1980).
Severo Aparicio Quispe, 89, Peruvian Roman Catholic prelate, Auxiliary Bishop of Cuzco (1978–1999).
Steve Carney, 55, English footballer (Newcastle United), pancreatic cancer.
Jānis Eglītis, 52,  Latvian politician.
Fatima Grimm, 78, German translator, author and speaker.
Michel Knuysen, 83, Belgian Olympic silver medallist rower (1952).
Ian MacLeod, 53, Scottish footballer (Motherwell).
Esperanza Magaz, 91, Cuban-born Venezuelan television actress (RCTV), cancer.
Steve Martland, 58, English composer, heart attack.
Arnaldo Ninchi, 77, Italian actor, voice actor and basketball player.
Michelangelo Spensieri, 64, Canadian politician and lawyer, member of the Legislative Assembly of Ontario for Yorkview (1981–1985).
Anne-Lise Stern, 91,  French psychoanalyst and Holocaust survivor.
Yang Tzuo-chow, 84, Taiwanese politician, MLY (1999–2002).<ref>前立委楊作洲辭世 國民黨追思 </ref>

7
Al Fritz, 88, American bicycle developer and inventor (Schwinn Sting-Ray), complications from a stroke.
Ray Harryhausen, 92, American stop-motion animator (Jason and the Argonauts, Clash of the Titans, The 7th Voyage of Sinbad).
Kozo Igarashi, 87, Japanese politician, member of the House of Representatives, Chief Cabinet Secretary (1994–1995), pneumonia.
Balbino Jaramillo, 61, Colombian Olympic cyclist.
Gunnel Johansson, 90, Swedish artistic gymnast.
Joseba Larrinaga, 45, Spanish Paralympic athlete, traffic collision.
P. G. Lim, 96, British-born Malaysian diplomat and lawyer, Ambassador to the United Nations, Yugoslavia, Austria and the European Economic Community.
Ferruccio Mazzola, 65,  Italian football player and manager.
Teri Moïse, 43, American singer, suicide. 
Mark Perakh, 88, American scientist and blogger.
Peter Rauhofer, 48, Austrian DJ, remixer and record producer, Grammy Award (2000), brain cancer.
Romanthony, 45, American DJ, record producer and singer ("One More Time", "Make This Love Right"), complications from kidney disease. 
Herbert Romerstein, 82, American anti–communist writer.
Mairuth Sarsfield, 88, Canadian broadcaster and author (No Crystal Stair).
George Sauer Jr., 69, American football player (New York Jets), heart failure.
Antônio da Silva Terezo, 59, Brazilian Olympic footballer.
Wiktor Tołkin, 91, Polish sculptor and architect.
Jan Villerius, 74, Dutch footballer, cancer.
Aubrey Woods, 85, British actor (Doctor Who, Willy Wonka and the Chocolate Factory).

8
Dan Adkins, 76, American comic book artist (The Avengers, Doctor Strange, X-Men).
Jeanne Cooper, 84, American actress (The Young and the Restless).
Zia Fariduddin Dagar, 80, Indian dhrupad vocalist, musician and maestro.
Bryan Forbes, 86, British actor (The League of Gentlemen), film director (The Stepford Wives) and screenwriter (Chaplin).
Ralph Homan, 84, American politician, member of the South Dakota House of Representatives (1983–1986).
Brita Malmer, 87, Swedish numismatist.
Taylor Mead, 88, American writer and actor (Coffee and Cigarettes), stroke.
Juan José Muñoz, 62, Argentine businessman, President of Gimnasia y Esgrima La Plata, renal failure. 
André Sana, 92, Iraqi Chaldean Catholic hierarch, Archbishop of Kirkuk (1977–2003).
Asaph Schwapp, 26, American football player (Hartford Colonials), non-Hodgkin's lymphoma.
Hugh J. Silverman, 67, American philosopher, cancer.
Géza Vermes, 88, Hungarian-born British theologian and Dead Sea Scrolls scholar, cancer.
Ken Whaley, 67, British rock musician (Man, Ducks Deluxe, Help Yourself), lung cancer.
Dallas Willard, 77, American author and philosopher, cancer.
Ernie Winchester, 68, Scottish footballer.

9
Alan Abelson, 87, American financial writer, editor and columnist (Barron's), heart attack.
Fred Ashton, 82, American politician, Mayor of Easton, Pennsylvania (1968–1976).
Ramón Blanco, 61, Spanish football player and manager (RCD Mallorca, Cadiz), cerebral infarction.
Grete Dollitz, 88, German–born American radio presenter and classical guitarist.
Sanaullah Haq, 52, Pakistani convict, beaten.
Patterson Hume, 90, Canadian professor and science educator.
Bonnie Huy, 77, American politician, member of the Kansas House of Representatives (2001–2006).
Alfredo Landa, 80, Spanish actor, Alzheimer's disease.
George M. Leader, 95, American politician, Governor of Pennsylvania (1955–1959).
Humberto Lugo Gil, 79, Mexican politician, Governor of Hidalgo (1998–1999). 
Dave Lyon, 74, Canadian Olympic track and field coach (1984, 1988, 1992, 2000).
Ottavio Missoni, 92, Italian fashion designer and Olympic hurdler (1948).
Paul Tangi Mhova Mkondo, 67, Zimbabwean businessman, cancer.
Huguette Oligny, 91, Canadian theatre actress.
Malcolm Shabazz, 28, American Islamist, grandson of Malcolm X, beaten.
Andrew Simpson, 36, British Olympic champion sailor (2008, 2012), catamaran capsize.
Joseph A. Steger, 76, American psychologist and academic, President of the University of Cincinnati (1984–2003).
Julia Tashjian, 74, American politician, Secretary of the State of Connecticut (1983–1991), heart attack.
Sadegh Tirafkan, 47, Iranian contemporary artist, brain cancer. 
Ron Weaver, 75, American Emmy Award-winning television producer (The Bold and the Beautiful, Sesame Street).

10
Félix Agramont Cota, 95, Mexican politician and agricultural engineer, first Governor of Baja California Sur (1970–1975), myocardial infarction.
Barbara Brenner, 61, American health activist, Executive Director of Breast Cancer Action (1993–2010), amyotrophic lateral sclerosis.
Sir John Bush, 98, British Royal Navy admiral, Commander-in-Chief Western Fleet (1967–1970).
Barbara Callcott, 66, Australian actress, cancer.
Malcolm Clarke, 82, British marine biologist. 
Jean Delobel, 80, French politician.
Vincent Dowling, 83, Irish actor and theatre director (The Playboy of the Western World), complications following surgery.
Laurence Haddon, 90, American actor (Mary Hartman, Mary Hartman, Dallas, Knots Landing), Lewy body disease.
Brigitte Kiesler, 88, German Olympic gymnast.
Aleksey Komarov, 91, Russian Olympic rower (1952). 
Boicho Kokinov, 52, Bulgarian cognitive scientist.
Hugh Mackay, 14th Lord Reay, 75, British peer, Member of the European Parliament (1973–1979), member of the House of Lords (since 1964).
Philippe Malivoire, 70, French rower.
Per Maurseth, 80, Norwegian historian and politician.
Malcolm Parkes, 83, English academic.
John Shea Jr., 84, American politician, member of the Connecticut House of Representatives (1961–1962).
Wanade, 71, Kenyan television actress, cancer.
Al-Haj Suliman Yari, 76, Afghan politician.

11
Johnny Bos, 61, American boxer and author, heart failure.
Jack Butler, 85, American Hall of Fame football player (Pittsburgh Steelers), complications from a staph infection.
Emmanuelle Claret, 44, French biathlete, world champion (1996), leukemia. 
Mike Davison, 67, American baseball player (San Francisco Giants).
Joe Farman, 82, British physicist, identified ozone hole.
Marianne Ferber, 90, Czech-born American feminist economist and author.
Doug Finley, 66, Canadian politician,  Senator for Ontario (since 2009), Campaign Director during the 2006 and 2008 elections, colorectal cancer.
Ollie Mitchell, 86, American big band musician (The Wrecking Crew and original member of Herb Alpert's Tijuana Brass), cancer.
Arnold Peters, 87, British actor (The Archers), complications from Alzheimer's disease.
Lenny Yochim, 84, American baseball player (Pittsburgh Pirates), heart failure.

12
Judit Ágoston-Mendelényi, 76, Hungarian Olympic champion fencer (1964).
Samuel Aguilar, 80, Paraguayan footballer.
Sergei Alexeyev, 88, Russian politician, author of the Constitution of Russia, heart attack.
Daisy Avellana, 96, Filipino stage actor and director, National Artist of the Philippines for Theater and Film.
Doug Beasy, 83, Australian football player (Carlton).
Olaf B. Bjørnstad, 82, Norwegian ski jumper.
George William Gray, 86, British scientist, recipient of the 1995 Kyoto Prize for Advanced Technology.
Mr. Kenneth, 86, American hairdresser (Jacqueline Kennedy, Marilyn Monroe), recipient of the Coty Award (1961).
Gerd Langguth, 66, German politician and political scientist.
Daniel W. LeBlanc, 82, American judge, member of Louisiana Court of Appeals, cancer.
Toni Linhart, 70, Austrian-born American football player (Baltimore Colts), cancer.
Julian Malonso, 89, Filipino military man, educator and sports executive, lingering illness.
Bill Miles, 82, American documentary filmmaker.
José García Quesada, 82, Chilean Olympic footballer.
Félix Ramananarivo, 78, Malagasy Roman Catholic prelate, Bishop of Antsirabe (1994–2009).
Francesco Renda, 91, Italian historian and politician.
Constantino Romero, 65, Spanish voice actor, television and radio host, motor neuron disease.
K Bikram Singh, 75, Indian filmmaker, complications from liver failure.
Max Stadler, 64, German politician, member of the Bundestag (since 1994).
Kenneth Waltz, 88, American political scientist.
Peter Worthington, 86, Canadian journalist (Toronto Telegram) and editor-in-chief (Toronto Sun).

13
Hedda Bolgar, 103, American psychoanalyst.
André Bord, 90, French politician, Veterans Minister (1972–1974), President of the Alsace Regional Council (1973–1977).
Joyce Brothers, 85, American psychologist, newspaper columnist, and actress (Loaded Weapon 1, Spy Hard), respiratory failure.
André Denys, 65, Belgian politician, Governor of East Flanders (2004–2013).
Dave Everett, 51, Australian criminal, cancer.
Otto Herrigel, 75, Namibian politician, cancer.
Enio Iommi, 87, Argentinian sculptor.
Jill Kitson, 74, Australian radio broadcaster and literary journalist.
Kennett Love, 88, American journalist (The New York Times), respiratory failure.
Luciano Lutring, 75, Italian criminal, painter and author.
Jagdish Mali, 59, Indian fashion photographer, multiple organ failure.
Chuck Muncie, 60, American football player (New Orleans Saints, San Diego Chargers), heart attack.
Daniel Offer, 83, American psychiatrist.
Sir Ellison Pogo, 66, Solomon Islands Anglican primate, Archbishop of Melanesia (1994–2008), lymphoma.
Lilo Ramdohr, 99, German Resistance fighter, member of the White Rose.
Vladimir Romanovsky, 56, Soviet Olympic sprint canoer  (Gold and silver medallist).
Derrick Thomas, 69, British agricultural researcher, cancer.
Fyodor Tuvin, 39, Russian footballer.
Lynne Woolstencroft, 69, Canadian politician, Mayor of Waterloo, Ontario (2000–2003), cancer.

14
Joy Baluch, 80, Australian politician, Mayor of Port Augusta (1981–1993, since 1995).
Wayne Brown, 76, American politician, Mayor of Mesa, Arizona (1996–2000).
Arsen Chilingaryan, 47, Armenian football player and manager.
Asghar Ali Engineer, 74, Indian writer and activist.
Billie Sol Estes, 88, American businessman and convicted con man.
Ray Guy, 74, Canadian humorist, writer and journalist, cancer.
*Mohammad Ezodin Hosseini Zanjani, 92, Iranian Islamic prelate, Grand Ayatollah, complications from surgery.
Marian Jeżak, 84, Polish ice hockey player.
Margaret Rayburn, 86, American politician, member of the Washington House of Representatives (1985–1995).
Sardar Arif Shahid, Pakistani Kashmiri politician, shot.
Harvansh Singh, 64, Indian politician, Madhya Pradesh MLA for Keolari (since 1993), cardiac arrest.
Ingrid Visser, 35, Dutch Olympic volleyball player (1996), homicide.
Lubomír Zajíček, 67, Czech Olympic bronze medallist volleyball player (1968).

15
Nasser al-Rashed, 20, Kuwaiti squash player, heart attack.
Noelle Barker, 84, British soprano and singing teacher.
Paddy Buggy, 84, Irish hurler (Kilkenny) and sport executive, President of the GAA (1982–1985).
Linden Chiles, 80, American actor (Quincy, M.E., Barnaby Jones, Perry Mason), fall.
Raul Gonzalez, 78, Filipino journalist, Press Secretary for Diosdado Macapagal (1961–1965), cancer.
Robert Hunt, 77, British police officer.
Gábor Gellért Kis, 66, Hungarian journalist, MP for Monor (1994–1998).
Albert Lance, 87, Australian-born French opera singer.
Thomas M. Messer, 93, Czechoslovakian-born American museum director (Solomon R. Guggenheim Foundation).
Bill O'Hagan, 68, British journalist and sausage maker.
Jens Elmegård Rasmussen, 69, Danish linguist and Indo-Europeanist.
Billy Raymond, 75, Scottish-born Australian entertainer, lung cancer.
Henrique Rosa, 67, Bissau-Guinean politician, Acting President (2003–2005), lung cancer.
James Stuart-Smith, 93, British judge and army officer, Advocate General of the Armed Forces (1984–1991).
Darrell Tryon, 70, New Zealand linguistics professor and Pacific Islands language specialist, melanoma.
Fred White, 76, American sports broadcaster (Kansas City Royals), complications from melanoma.
Harold Whitfield, 94, South African cricketer.

16
Richard Andriamanjato, 82, Malagasy politician.
Carl Bennett, 97, American basketball executive, coach and GM of Detroit Pistons.
Félix Bonnat, 92, French bobsledder.
Kristen Kyrre Bremer, 87, Norwegian theologian and bishop. 
Mario Brescia Cafferata, 83, Peruvian billionaire financial and industrial executive.
Angelo Errichetti, 84, American politician, Mayor of Camden, New Jersey (1973–1981); member of the New Jersey Senate (1976–1981).
Fiona Gore, 94, Scottish powerboating racer.
Geoffrey Gowan, 83, Canadian sports broadcaster (CBC) and executive (CAC), Parkinson's disease.
Frank Nigel Hepper, 84, English botanist.
Bryan Illerbrun, 56, Canadian football player (Saskatchewan Roughriders). 
Ivar Kallion, 81, Estonian Communist politician, chairman of the Executive Committee of Tallinn (1971–1979).
Valtr Komárek, 82, Czech politician, complications following cardiac surgery.
Frankie Librán, 65, American Puerto Rican baseball player (San Diego Padres), complications from diabetes.
Maurice Marshall, 86, New Zealand Olympic middle-distance athlete (1952).
Heinrich Rohrer, 79, Swiss physicist, Nobel laureate (1986).
Paul Shane, 72, British actor and comedian (Hi-de-Hi!, You Rang, M'Lord?).
Max Schirschin, 92, German football player and manager (Rouen, Le Havre, Metz).
Dick Trickle, 71, American NASCAR driver, suicide by gunshot.
Bernard Waber, 88, American children's author (Lyle, Lyle, Crocodile), kidney failure.

17
Dominic Kodwo Andoh, 84, Ghanaian Roman Catholic prelate, Archbishop of Accra (1971–2005), heart-related ailment.
Philippe Gaumont, 40, French Olympic racing cyclist (1992), heart failure. 
John Goddard, 88, American adventurer, cancer.
 Penne Hackforth-Jones, 63, American-born Australian actress (Mao's Last Dancer), lung cancer.
Elijah Harper, 64, Canadian Cree politician and band chief, Manitoba MLA for Rupertsland (1981–1992), MP for Churchill (1993–1997), heart failure.
Jack Hawkins, 96, American Marine Corps officer (Bay of Pigs Invasion).
Lola Hendricks, 80, American activist.
Tauatomo Mairau, French Polynesian royal claimant.
Alan O'Day, 72, American singer-songwriter ("Undercover Angel", "Angie Baby"), brain cancer.
Jérôme Reehuis, 73, Dutch actor.
Colin A. Russell, 84, British historian.
Peter Schulz, 83, German politician, First Mayor of Hamburg (1971–1974).
Albert Seedman, 94, American police officer.
Harold Shapero, 93, American composer and pianist (Symphony for Classical Orchestra), complications from pneumonia.
Taronda Spencer, 54, American archivist, heart attack.
Sir Rodney Sweetnam, 86, British surgeon, President of the Royal College of Surgeons (1995–1998).
Anthony Trickett, 73, British doctor, Lord Lieutenant of Orkney (since 2007).
Don Tonry, 77, American Olympic gymnast.
Ken Venturi, 82, American golfer and golf analyst, winner of the U.S. Open (1964), World Golf Hall of Fame inductee (2013), multiple infections.
Jorge Rafael Videla, 87, Argentine military lieutenant general and politician, President (1976–1981), complications from a fall.

18
Aleksei Balabanov, 54, Russian filmmaker, seizure.
Jo Benkow, 88, Norwegian writer and politician, President of the Parliament (1985–1993).
Isabel Benham, 103, American railroad businesswoman.
Neil Chrisley, 81, American baseball player (Washington Senators, Detroit Tigers).
Steve Forrest, 87, American actor (Dallas, North Dallas Forty, S.W.A.T).
Zahra Shahid Hussain, 69, Pakistani politician, shot.
Marek Jackowski, 66, Polish rock musician (Maanam).
Ernst Klee, 71, German historian and writer.
Arthur Malet, 85, English actor (Mary Poppins, Halloween, In the Heat of the Night, Anastasia).
Max, 29, beagle, dachshund and terrier mix, world's oldest dog, Tonic–clonic seizure.
David McMillan, 31, American football player (Cleveland Browns), shot.
Nam Duck-woo, 89, South Korean politician, Prime Minister (1980–1982), testicular cancer.
Newton Russell, 85, American politician, member of the California State Assembly (1964–1974) and California Senate (1974–1996), lung cancer.
Lothar Schmid, 85, German chess grandmaster.
Harold Sossen, 88, American businessman.
Claramae Turner, 92, American opera singer (Carousel, The Medium).

19
Sasanka Chandra Bhattacharyya, 94, Indian natural product chemist.
Leonard Erickson, 66, American oncologist.
Bella Flores, 84, Filipino actress, complications from hip surgery.
G. Sarsfield Ford, 79, American judge, member of the Connecticut Supreme Court.
Michael Kpakala Francis, 77, Liberian Roman Catholic prelate, Archbishop of Monrovia (1981–2011).
Leonard Harbin, 98, Trinidad cricketer.
Robin Harrison, 80, Canadian pianist and composer, heart attack.
Vuyo Mbuli, 46,  South African television personality and news presenter, pulmonary embolism.
Carlo Monni, 69, Italian character actor.
Murat Öztürk, 60, Turkish aerobatics pilot, plane crash.
Neil Reynolds, 72, Canadian newspaper editor (The Ottawa Citizen), cancer.
Mirek Smíšek, 88, Czech-born New Zealand potter.
Ally Sykes, 86, Tanzanian politician.
Franklin White, 90, British ballet dancer.
Alexey Dobrovolsky, 74, Russian ideologue of neo-paganism.

20
Yohanan Cohen, 95, Israeli politician and diplomat. 
Dave Costa, 71, American football player (Oakland Raiders, Denver Broncos).
Flavio Costantini, 86, Italian artist.
Billie Dawe, 88, Canadian ice hockey player.
Anders Eliasson, 66, Swedish composer.
Ari Huumonen, 57, Finnish discus thrower.
Miloslav Kříž, 88, Czech basketball player and coach.
Ray Manzarek, 74, American rock musician (The Doors), bile duct cancer.
Jevan Maseko, 70, Zimbabwean military officer, Governor of Matabeleland North Province, Ambassador to Algeria, Russia and Cuba, diabetes and kidney failure.
Idriss Ndélé Moussa, 54, Chadian politician, President of Pan African Parliament (2009–2012), traffic collision.
Sir Denys Roberts, 90, British colonial official and judge, Chief Justice of Hong Kong (1979–1988).
Harry Schuh, 70, American football player (Oakland Raiders, University of Memphis).
Zach Sobiech, 18, American pop singer and viral video performer, osteosarcoma.
Dominik Sucheński, 86, Polish Olympic sprinter.

21
Trevor Bolder, 62, British musician (David Bowie, Uriah Heep), cancer.
Antoine Bourseiller, 82, French comedian and opera director.
Eddie Braben, 82, British comedy writer (Morecambe and Wise, Ken Dodd).
Evelyne Bradley, 88, American Navajo judge, District Court judge (1984–1995).
Robert Chambers, 59, New Zealand judge, member of the Supreme Court (since 2011).
Frank Comstock, 90, American composer.
Cot Deal, 90, American baseball player (Boston Red Sox, St. Louis Cardinals).
Peter Ellis, 66, Australian football player.
Zsolt Erőss, 45, Hungarian mountaineer.
Mick Grambeau, 83, Australian rules footballer.
Mohammad Khaled Hossain, 34, Bangladeshi mountaineer and film director.
Keith Jukes, 59, English Anglican clergyman, Dean of Ripon (since 2007), stomach cancer.
Harold Long, 72, Canadian politician,  British Columbia MLA for Mackenzie (1986–1991) and Powell River-Sunshine Coast (2001–2005), plane crash.
Louis de Cartier de Marchienne, 91, Belgian baron and businessman.
Hank Kozloski, 85, American sportswriter.
Leonard Marsh, 80, American beverage executive, co-founder of Snapple.
Vernon McGarity, 91, American soldier (Battle of the Bulge), recipient of the Medal of Honor (1946).
Fred Mitchell, 89, American artist. 
Edna Moyle, 71, Caymanian politician, MLA for North Side (1992–2009), Speaker (2001–2009), cancer.
Charley Reese, 76, American newspaper columnist, respiratory failure.
Count Christian of Rosenborg, 70, Danish royal.
Anand Shetty, 52, Indian sprinter, car accident.
Mykola Simkaylo, 60, Ukrainian Greek Catholic hierarch, Bishop of Kolomyia – Chernivtsi (since 2005).
Bob Thompson, 88, American composer and orchestra leader.
Dominique Venner, 78, French historian, journalist and essayist, suicide by gunshot.

22
Bill Austin, 84, American football player (New York Giants).
Dick Barry, 87, American politician, member of the Tennessee House of Representatives (1954–1967), Speaker (1963–1967).
Wayne Cottrell, 69, New Zealand rugby union player.
Henri Dutilleux, 97, French composer.
Andrea Gallo, 84, Italian presbyter.
Brian Greenhoff, 60, English footballer (Manchester United).
Sarah P. Harkness, 98, American architect. 
Usha Rani Hooja, 90, Indian sculptor.
William Douglas Lansford, 90, American writer.
Elizabeth Mavor, 85, British writer.
Mick McManus, 93, English professional wrestler.
Wayne F. Miller, 94, American photographer.
Lawrence Pope, 73, American politician and academic, member of the Iowa House of Representatives (1979–1983), renal cancer.
Éric Remacle, 52, Belgian scientist.
Pat Shea, 73, American football player (San Diego Chargers).
Sigurd Ottovich Schmidt, 91, Russian historian and ethnographer.
Richard Thorp, 81, English actor (Emmerdale).
Ibragim Todashev, 27, Chechen–born American mixed martial artist, shot.
Teruto Tsubota, 90, American marine (Battle of Okinawa).

23
John Antonio, 83, American advertising executive, created Clemson University tiger paw logo, cancer.
William Demby, 90, American writer.
Dick Evey, 72, American football player (Chicago Bears, University of Tennessee).
Richard G. Fallon, 89, American academic and theatre director (Asolo Repertory Theatre).
Lenin Gani, 45, Bangladeshi sports journalist, pulmonary hypertension.
Epy Guerrero, 71, Dominican Major League Baseball scout (Houston Astros, New York Yankees, Toronto Blue Jays), kidney failure.
Hazel Hawke, 83, Australian social activist and National Treasure, first wife of Prime Minister Bob Hawke, complications of dementia.
In Excess, 26, Irish-born American Thoroughbred racehorse. (death announced on this date)
J. Christopher Jaffe, 85, American acoustical engineer.
Hayri Kozakçıoğlu, 75, Turkish politician, shot.
Moritz, Landgrave of Hesse, 86, German prince and Head of the House of Hesse.
Michael Lev, 95, Ukrainian-born Israeli writer.
Georges Moustaki, 79, Egyptian-born French singer and songwriter.
Gerry Peacocke, 81, Australian politician, NSW MLA for Dubbo (1981–1999).
Flynn Robinson, 72, American basketball player (Los Angeles Lakers, Milwaukee Bucks), multiple myeloma.
Brian Sternberg, 69, American pole vaulter, quadriplegic complications.
Jim Zabel, 91, American sports broadcaster (University of Iowa).
Luis Zuloaga, 90, Venezuelan baseball player (Leones del Caracas).

24
Elsa Bornemann, 61, Argentine children's writer.
Helmut Braunlich, 84, American composer.
Michel Crozier, 90, French sociologist.
Ron Davies, 70, Welsh footballer Norwich, Southampton.
John F. Dolan, 90, American politician. 
Gabriel Fernandez, 8, American child murder victim.
Gotthard Graubner, 82,  German painter.
Huang Yu, 96, Chinese film director, screenwriter and actor.
Haynes Johnson, 81, American journalist (The Washington Post, Washington Evening Star), winner of Pulitzer Prize (1966), heart attack.
Yevgeny Kychanov, 80, Russian orientalist. 
John Lucas, 92, British Army officer.
Lorene Mann, 76, American country music singer and songwriter.
Arnoldo Martínez Verdugo, 88, Mexican politician.
Godwin Mawuru, 52, Zimbabwean filmmaker and television producer, complications from diabetes.
John "Mule" Miles, 90, American Negro league baseball player.
Sir Garth Morrison, 70, British scouter, Chief Scout (1988–1996).
Ralph Perlman, 96, American public official, Louisiana budget director (1967–1988).
Antonio Puchades, 87, Spanish footballer (Valencia CF), Alzheimer's disease.
Ed Shaughnessy, 84, American drummer (The Tonight Show Starring Johnny Carson), heart attack.
Rob Smith, 61, Australian footballer.
John Sumner, 88, Australian founder and artistic director of the Melbourne Theatre Company.
Pyotr Todorovsky, 87, Ukrainian-born Russian film director (Wartime Romance), screenwriter (What a Wonderful Game) and cinematographer, heart attack.
Tripura, 84, Indian writer.
Erling Welle-Strand, 96, Norwegian writer and resistance member.

25
Mohammed Rashad Abdulle, 79, Ethiopian academic.
Gordon Berg, 85, American politician, member of the North Dakota House of Representatives (1977–1991).
Harry Birrell, 85, American radio news broadcaster (KNX (AM)), interstitial lung disease.
Tyrone Brunson, 57, American musician.
Walt Budko, 87, American basketball player.
Gene Burns, 72, American political radio broadcaster and food critic, complications from a stroke.
Paul Cuprowski, 73, American politician, member of the New Jersey General Assembly (1983–1985).
Larry Johnson, 62, American baseball player.
Mahendra Karma, 62, Indian political leader, founder of Salwa Judum, shot.
Jan Kinder, 68, Norwegian Olympic ice hockey player.
Marshall Lytle, 79, American rock and roll musician (Bill Haley & His Comets), Rock and Roll Hall of Fame inductee (2012), lung cancer.
Uday Mudliyar, Indian politician, Chhattisgarh MLA for Rajnandgaon (1993–1998), shot.
Nand Kumar Patel, 59, Indian politician, Chhattisgarh MLA for Kharsia (since 1990), shot.
Ronald Payne, 87, British journalist and war correspondent.
T. M. Soundararajan, 91, Indian playback singer.
Jimmy Wray, 78, British politician, MP for Glasgow Provan (1987–1997) and Glasgow Baillieston (1997–2005).
Lewis Yocum, 66, American orthopedist, specialist in Tommy John surgery, liver cancer.

26
Ray Barnhart, 85, American businessman and politician, Director of the Federal Highway Administration (1981–1987).
John Bierwirth, 89, American aircraft executive, Chairman of Grumman (1972–1988).
Roberto Civita, 76, Italian-born Brazilian businessman, CEO of Grupo Abril, heart failure.
Mbuya Dyoko, 68, Zimbabwean musician, cirrhosis.
Héctor Garza, 43, Mexican professional wrestler, lung cancer.
Graham Leggett, 92, British RAF squadron leader, youngest surviving pilot of the Battle of Britain.
Tom Lichtenberg, 72, American football coach (University of Maine, Ohio University), cancer.
Charles M. McGowan, 89, American politician, member of the Massachusetts House of Representatives (1968–1978).
Otto Muehl, 87, Austrian painter and activist, Parkinson's disease and cardiac ailment.
José María Pérez Gay, 70, Mexican journalist, academic and diplomat, Ambassador to Portugal, National Journalism Prize (1996).
Happy Pieterse, 70, South African boxer, complications of diabetes.
Jack Vance, 96, American science fiction author.

27
György Bárdy, 92, Hungarian actor.
Jean Bach, 94, American filmmaker (A Great Day in Harlem).
Nazmiye Demirel, 86, Turkish first lady, wife of Süleyman Demirel, Alzheimer's disease.
Cullen Finnerty, 30, American football player, pneumonia (Grand Valley State University).
Steven Klepper, 64, American economist.
Muttanisseril Koyakutty, 86, Indian Islamic scholar and writer. 
Little Tony, 72, Italian-born Sammarinese pop singer and actor, lung cancer.
Jagjit Singh Lyallpuri, 96, Indian politician.
Bill Pertwee, 86, British radio and television actor (Dad's Army, You Rang, M'Lord?) and author.
Abdoulaye Sékou Sow, 83, Malian politician, Prime Minister (1993–1994).
Giacomo Soffiantino, 84, Italian painter and artist.
Beverley Taylor Sorenson, 89,  American education philanthropist.

28
Silvério Paulo de Albuquerque, 96, Brazilian Roman Catholic prelate, Bishop of Caetité (1970–1973) and Feira de Santana (1973–1995).
Eddi Arent, 88, German actor.
Nino Bibbia, 91, Italian Olympic skeleton racer and bobsledder (1948).
Robert Chalmers, 67, South African cricketer.
Abigail Heyman, 70, American feminist journalist, heart failure.
Viktor Kulikov, 91, Russian military officer, Marshal of the Soviet Union (1977), Warsaw Pact commander-in-chief (1977–1989).
R. Travis Osborne, 99, American psychologist and professor emeritus.
Fotis Polymeris, 93, Greek musician.
William Earl Reid, 78, Canadian politician, Minister of Tourism for British Columbia (1986–1989).
Eddie Romero, 88, Filipino film director, blood clot and prostate cancer.
Gerd Schmückle, 95, German general.
Caesar Trunzo, 87, American politician, member of the New York Senate (1972–2008).
Masuko Ushioda, 71, Japanese violinist, acute leukemia.

29
Werner Andermatt, 96, Swiss painter.
Ramón Aguirre Suárez, 68, Argentine footballer (Estudiantes de La Plata).
Richard Ballantine, 72, British cycling writer.
Nino Baragli, 88, Italian film editor (The Good, the Bad and the Ugly, Once Upon a Time in the West).
Donald Bevan, 93, American author.
Françoise Blanchard, 58, French actress (La Morte Vivante).
Mike Carrell, 69, American politician, member of the Washington House (1994–2004) and Washington State Senate (since 2004), myelodysplastic syndrome.
Juan Américo Díaz, 68, Bolivian footballer.
Jabulani Dube, Zimbabwean politician, MP-elect for Insiza South.
Andrew Greeley, 85, American Roman Catholic priest, author (The Cardinal Sins) and columnist (Chicago Sun-Times), complications from skull fracture.
Mamman Kontagora, 69, Nigerian military officer and politician.
Cliff Meely, 65, American basketball player (University of Colorado, Houston Rockets), blood infection.
Mulgrew Miller, 57, American jazz pianist, stroke.
Henry Morgentaler, 90, Polish-born Canadian physician, abortion advocate, Holocaust survivor, heart attack.
Franca Rame, 83, Italian theatre actress, playwright, political activist, and wife of Dario Fo.
Dame Margaret Shields, 71, New Zealand politician, MP for Kapiti (1981–1990), dementia and Parkinson's disease.
Ludwig G. Strauss, 63, German physician and academic, cancer.
Wali-ur-Rehman, 42, Pakistani Taliban militant, military action.

30
Dean Brooks, 96, American physician and actor (One Flew Over the Cuckoo's Nest).
Elliot del Borgo, 74, American composer.
Michael Baillie, 3rd Baron Burton, 88, British aristocrat.
Harold A. Carter, 76, American pastor, cancer.
Güzin Dino, 102, Turkish literary scholar.
Raymond Evans, 92,  United States Coast Guardsman.
Rituparno Ghosh, 49, Indian filmmaker, cardiac arrest.
Ted Gorin, 89, Welsh professional footballer.
Helen Hanft, 79, American actress (Manhattan), intestinal complications.
Arquímedes Herrera, 77, Venezuelan Olympic track and field athlete (1964).
Tamás Homonnay, 87, Hungarian Olympic athlete.
Jayalath Jayawardena, 59, Sri Lankan politician, physician and human rights campaigner, heart disease.
Larry Jones, 79, American football player and coach (Florida State University, 1971–1973).
Kyprianos Koutsoumpas, 78, Greek Orthodox hierarch, Metropolitan of Oropos and Fili, President of Synod of the Old Calendarist Church of Greece, stroke.
Vina Mazumdar, 86, Indian academic and women's activist, lung tumour.
Andrzej Nowak, 57, Polish ice hockey player.
Péter Szilágyi, 59, Hungarian conductor and politician, MP for Berettyóújfalu (1994–2002).

31
Mufti Abdullah, 82, Pakistani politician, Gilgit-Baltistan MLA for Khaplu.
Eelco van Asperen, 48, Dutch computer scientist.
Jeff Berry, 64, American Knights of the Ku Klux Klan leader, lung cancer.
Gerald E. Brown, 86, American theoretical physicist.  
Elvin Feltner, 83, American broadcaster and film producer (Carnival Magic).
Abir Goswami, 37, Indian television actor, heart attack.
Tommy Henderson, 85, English footballer (Burnley F.C.).
Jeffrey Hunker, 56, American cyber security expert and academic.
Frederic Lindsay, 79, Scottish novelist. 
Miguel Méndez, 82, American author.
Jairo Mora, 26, Costa Rican environmentalist, shot.  
Richie Phillips, 72, American baseball umpire union official, cardiac arrest.
Marta Romero, 85, American Puerto Rican actress and singer.
Tim Samaras, 55, American tornado chaser (Storm Chasers, TWISTEX), crushed vehicle tornado injuries.
Jean Stapleton, 90, American actress (All in the Family, You've Got Mail, Michael''), Emmy winner (1971, 1972, 1978).

References

2013-05
 05